Hyastenus bispinosus is a species of crab in the family Epialtidae, found around Ambon, the Banda Islands, Timor and the Lembeh Strait off Sulawesi.

References

Majoidea
Crustaceans described in 1939
Fauna of Timor
Crustaceans of the Pacific Ocean